Dipika Damerla is a Canadian politician in Mississauga, Ontario. She is the current Mississauga City Councillor for Ward 7, the neighbourhood of Cooksville, since her swearing-in on December 3, 2018. Previously, Damerla was a Liberal member of the Legislative Assembly of Ontario representing the riding of Mississauga East—Cooksville from 2011 to 2018. She served as Minister of Seniors Affairs in the Cabinet of Premier Kathleen Wynne.

Background
Damerla was born in a Telugu-speaking family in Secunderabad, Andhra Pradesh (present day Telangana), India. After emigrating to Canada she earned her MBA from the Rotman School of Management at the University of Toronto. She worked in corporate banking at the Royal Bank of Canada and the Bank of Nova Scotia. Prior to her first election to the Ontario Legislature she was Senior Policy Advisor to Ontario's Minister of Economic Development and Trade. She lives in Mississauga with her daughter, Sharmeila.

Provincial politics
Damerla is a member of the Ontario Liberal Party. She won a tough 2011 nomination race to be the Liberal candidate for Mississauga East—Cooksville, beating Nancy Fonseca (the sister of previous Mississauga East—Cooksville MPP Peter Fonseca). She beat her nearest rival, Progressive Conservative Zoran Churchin by 4,238 votes in the 2011 provincial election.

In November 2011, she was appointed as Parliamentary Assistant to the Minister of Infrastructure. In April 2012, Damerla introduced a resolution to reform the 1998 Condominium Act. Her resolution would help facilitate disputes between condominium boards and owners. She said that the current system is long and costly. She said, "the act provided a dispute resolution process which was right for that time and the place. However, 14 years later, times have changed. Our province is a very different place now." The resolution passed first reading in June.

She was re-elected in the 2014 provincial election.

Cabinet Minister
In June 2014, Damerla was appointed as an Associate Minister (minister without portfolio) for the Ministry of Health and Long-Term Care focusing on long-term care. She then succeeded Mario Sergio as Minister responsible for Seniors Affairs, another minister without portfolio position, in a June 13, 2016 cabinet shuffle.

Damerla was appointed Minister of Seniors Affairs, leading a new standalone ministry created from the former Ontario Seniors' Secretariat, on January 12, 2017.

In the 2018 provincial election, Damerla was defeated in Mississauga East—Cooksville by Progressive Conservative candidate Kaleed Rasheed.

Municipal politics
Damerla registered on July 19, 2018, to run as a candidate to replace retiring Ward 7 Mississauga City Councillor Nando Iannica in the 2018 Mississauga municipal election. Damerla was elected with a large margin, the first new councillor for Ward 7 in over 30 years. On December 12, 2018, she was one of 10 members of city council that voted to ban physical cannabis retail shops in Mississauga.

Electoral record

Municipal

Provincial

Notes

References

External links

Women government ministers of Canada
Indian emigrants to Canada
Canadian Hindus
Living people
Politicians from Secunderabad
Ontario Liberal Party MPPs
Mississauga city councillors
Women MPPs in Ontario
Members of the Executive Council of Ontario
University of Toronto alumni
21st-century Canadian politicians
21st-century Canadian women politicians
Canadian politicians of Indian descent
Year of birth missing (living people)
Women municipal councillors in Canada